Sir Jeremy Israel Isaacs (born 28 September 1932) is a Scottish television producer and executive, opera manager, and a recipient of many British Academy Television Awards and International Emmy Awards. 

Isaacs won the British Film Institute Fellowship in 1986, the International Emmy Directorate Award in 1987 and the BAFTA Fellowship in 1985. He was also the General Director of the Royal Opera House, Covent Garden from 1987 to 1996.

Isaacs was knighted in the 1996 Birthday Honours "for services to Broadcasting and to the Arts."

Early life
Isaacs was born in Glasgow from what were described as "Scottish Jewish roots". He grew up in Hillhead, the son of a jeweller and a GP, and is a cousin to virologist Alick Isaacs. He was educated at the independent Glasgow Academy and Merton College, Oxford, where he read Classics.  He did his National Service in the Highland Light Infantry.

Television career
Isaacs began his career in television when he joined Granada Television in Manchester as a producer in 1958. At Granada he was involved in creating or supervising series such as World in Action and What the Papers Say. He has worked for the BBC (on Panorama) in the 1960s and was the overall producer for the 26-episode series The World at War (1973–74) for Thames Television. He was Director of Programmes for Thames between 1974 and 1978. Later, he produced Ireland: A Television History (1981) for the BBC and co-produced the twenty-four episode television documentary series Cold War (1998) and the ten-part series Millennium (1999).

Channel 4
Isaacs was the founding chief executive of Channel 4 between 1981 and 1987, overseeing its launch period and setting the channel's original cultural approach with opera and foreign language film, although such programmes as the pop music series The Tube and soap opera Brookside had a place in the schedule from the beginning. The channel commissioned Michael Elliott's production of King Lear (1983) with Laurence Olivier in the title role and Isaacs recommissioned a number of programmes from his time at Granada including What the Papers Say. 

His appointment of David Rose, previously long with the BBC, as the Commissioning Editor for Fiction led to the Channel's involvement with the eighties revival of the British film industry via the Film on Four strand. Despite a general liberal atmosphere, a few commissioned programmes, such as Ken Loach's A Question of Leadership, were withdrawn from transmission.

In 1989, Isaacs named twenty-six personal favourites from his tenure as Channel 4's chief executive, running from A (the discussion series After Dark) to Z (a four-hour dramatisation of a Gothic horror novel, Zastrozzi).

When handing over responsibility for running the channel to Michael Grade, Isaacs threatened to throttle him if he betrayed the trust placed in him to respect the channel's remit.

Later career
After leaving Channel 4 at the end of 1987, and having failed to be appointed Director General of the BBC, Isaacs became General Director of the Royal Opera House, Covent Garden, a role he fulfilled until 1996. This was a difficult period for the ROH, which was not helped by the broadcast of the revealing The House (1996) documentary series on BBC2.

From 1989 to 1998, Isaacs was the interviewer in a revival of the BBC series Face to Face; the former politician and journalist John Freeman had filled this role in the original 1959–62 run.

Ted Turner sought out Isaacs (confusing him with the actor Jeremy Irons) for the role of executive producer for the 24-episode Cold War (1998) series. Between 1997 and 2000, Isaacs was president of the Royal Television Society. He was also chairman of Artsworld before it was sold to Sky.

Publications
 Storm Over 4: A Personal Account, Weidenfeld & Nicolson, 1989
 Never Mind the Moon, Bantam Press, 1999  
 Look Me in the Eye: A Life in Television, Little, Brown, 2006  
 Cold War (In collaboration with Taylor Downing), Bantam Press, 1998

References

External links

Cold War: About the Series at CNN.com
 Raymond Snoddy (interview with  Isaacs), "Sir Jeremy Isaacs: History man - a life in pictures", The Independent (London) 27 February 2006 Retrieved 3 March 2008
Sabine Durrant (interview with Isaacs), "It hurts, it hurts, it hurts", The Guardian (London), 5 November 1999 Retrieved 3 March 2008

1932 births
Alumni of Merton College, Oxford
BAFTA fellows
British arts administrators
Channel 4 people
Highland Light Infantry soldiers
International Emmy Directorate Award
Knights Bachelor
Living people
Opera managers
People associated with the University of East Anglia
People educated at the Glasgow Academy
People from Hillhead
Presidents of the Oxford Union
Royal Opera House
Scottish Jews
Scottish people of Lithuanian-Jewish descent
Scottish television executives
The World at War
Fellows of Merton College, Oxford
20th-century British Army personnel